This article is about the rolling stock of the Bluebell Railway.

Steam locomotives

On loan/Visitors

Operational

Undergoing overhaul, repair or restoration

Under construction

Stored or on display

Diesel locomotives

On loan

Operational

Electric motive power

Stored or on display

Carriages

4- and 6-wheeled coaches 
The eventual plan is to put together two complete 4- or 5-coach sets of LBSCR and LCDR carriages. It is acknowledged that this will take many years, but three carriages are already in service with another three under overhaul.  Most of these carriages have been rescued as grounded bodies from within bungalows or on farms. Underframes for many of them are (or will be) provided by shortening SR passenger-rated van underframes.

Pre-grouping bogie coaches 
The operational coaches of this type form a set of coaches which have operated over recent years as the Bluebell's regular Vintage set. The Bluebell possesses one of the largest collections of these types of carriage in the world.

Metropolitan carriages 
Four carriages built in 1898 and 1900 for use out of Baker Street station in London. Initially steam hauled, later used in electric trains, reverting to steam haulage on the Chesham branch in 1940. Purchased by the Bluebell Railway in 1961, and used until withdrawn in the late 1960s in need of major attention. Now returned to service and are unique as a close-coupled set of vintage carriages. The restoration team were the recipient of the Heritage Railways Association's award as overall winner of their 2006/7 carriage competition. The carriages have seen regular use on London Underground in recent years as part of steam operations on the Metropolitan line, and possess TOPS identities for movements over the Network Rail network to and from London.

Maunsell coaches 
The carriages designed by Richard Maunsell for the Southern Railway had a restrained elegance. In preservation terms they provide a superb vintage experience for the passenger, whilst as corridor vehicles they also offer access to more modern facilities. In addition to those preserved on the railway, the Bluebell also has the underframe of coach 3725 and the bogies from several other coaches that were converted to Carflat wagons in the 1960s. For more information see SR Maunsell carriage

Bulleid carriages 
The 1940s Southern Railway designs of Oliver Bulleid produced a very clean, modern-looking carriage, many of the features of which were perpetuated in the BR standard (Mk. I) designs. The Bluebell's collection contains examples of SR built, contractor built and BR built carriages. It is unfortunate that none of the shorter, early Bulleid designed carriages have survived.

British Railways standard steam stock (Mk.I) 
The staple of most preserved railways, on the Bluebell Mk1s only form a proportion of the operational stock. They are a durable design, representing in many ways the culmination of traditional carriage design in the UK, prior to the introduction of monocoque techniques.

Pullman and Wagon-Lits cars 
Several of these have been overhauled and operate regularly as the Bluebell Railway's Golden Arrow dining train (lunch and dinner).

Observation car, Royal and Directors' saloons 
The Observation cars are occasionally brought out for a ride in. They provide a unique view of the railway and are either attached to the back of a passenger train or used on their own.

Non-passenger coaching stock 
The Bluebell has a large collection of wagons which were originally used in passenger trains. This section also includes carriages used for service purposes by the Bluebell that were originally passenger carriages.

Pre-grouping vans

Southern Railway vans, etc.

LMS & BR

Mk. I carriages used for non-traffic purposes

Milk tanks

Goods wagons 

The Bluebell has a large collection of goods wagons. Some are used in demonstration goods trains at various times of the year.

Brake vans

Covered goods vans

Open goods wagons

Flat wagons and bolster wagons

Tank wagons

Ballast wagons

Cranes and other special use wagons

Former Stock 
This section is currently under construction.

Steam locomotives 
Locomotives that used to be based on the Bluebell Railway.

Carriages

References

Further reading
Locomotive stock list (Bluebell website)
Carriage stock list (Bluebell website)
Wagon stock list (Bluebell website)
Inns, R. & Scott-Morgan, J. [1996] Bluebell Railway Locomotives - as they were

Bluebell Railway